Frank Hershey  (December 13, 1877 – December 15, 1949) was a Major League Baseball right-handed pitcher. He played in one game, on April 20, 1905 for the Boston Beaneaters.

Sources
Frank Hershey at Baseball Reference.com

Baseball players from New York (state)
1877 births
1949 deaths
Boston Beaneaters players
Major League Baseball pitchers
Ilion Typewriters players
Penn Yan players
People from Gorham, New York